Joaquim Gonçalves Rebelo, known as Rebelo (born 12 February 1961) is a former Portuguese footballer.

He played 11 seasons and 308 games in the Primeira Liga for Estrela da Amadora.

Club career
He made his Primeira Liga debut for Estrela da Amadora on 28 August 1988 in a game against Braga.

Honours
Estrela da Amadora
Taça de Portugal winner: 1989–90.

References

Living people
1961 births
People from Loures
Association football defenders
Association football midfielders
Portuguese footballers
C.F. Estrela da Amadora players
Primeira Liga players
Liga Portugal 2 players
Sportspeople from Lisbon District